Human communication, or anthroposemiotics, is a field of study dedicated to understanding how humans communicate. Humans ability to communicate with one another would not be possible without an understanding of what we are referencing or thinking about. Because humans are unable to fully understand one another's perspective, there needs to be a creation of commonality through a shared mindset or viewpoint. The field of communication is very diverse, as there are multiple layers of what communication is and how we use its different features as human beings.

Humans have communicatory abilities other animals do not, for example, humans are able to communicate about time and place as though they are solid objects. Humans communicate to request help, to inform others, and to share attitudes for bonding. Communication is a joint activity largely dependent on the ability to maintain common attention. We share relevant background knowledge and joint experience in order to communicate content and coherence in exchanges.

The evolution of human communication took place over a long period of time. Humans evolved from simple hand gestures to the use of spoken language. Most face-to-face communication requires visually reading and following along with the other person, offering gestures in reply, and maintaining eye contact throughout the interaction.

Category
The current study of human communication can be branched off into two major categories; rhetorical and relational. The focus of rhetorical communication is primarily on the study of influence; the art of rhetorical communication is based on the idea of persuasion. The relational approach examines communication from a transactional perspective; two or more people interact to reach an agreed perspective.

In its early stages, rhetoric was developed to help ordinary people prove their claims in court; this shows how persuasion is key in this form of communication. Aristotle stated that effective rhetoric is based on argumentation. As explained in the text, rhetoric involves a dominant party and a submissive party or a party that succumbs to that of the most dominant party. While the rhetorical approach stems from Western societies, the relational approach stems from Eastern societies. Eastern societies hold higher standards for cooperation, which makes sense as to why they would sway more toward a relational approach for that matter. "Maintaining valued relationships is generally seen as more important than exerting influence and control over others". "The study of human communication today is more diversified than ever before in its history".

Classification of human communication can be found in the workplace, especially for group work. Co-workers need to argue with each other to gain the best solutions for their projects, while they also need to nurture their relationship to maintain their collaboration. For example, in their group work, they may use the communication tactic of "saving face".

Spoken language involves speech, mostly human quality to acquire. For example, chimpanzees are humans' closest relative, but they are unable to produce speech.  Chimpanzees are the closest living species to humans. Chimpanzees are closer to humans, in genetic and evolutionary terms, than they are to gorillas or other apes. The fact that a chimpanzee will not acquire speech, even when raised in a human home with all the environmental input of a normal human child, is one of the central puzzles we face when contemplating the biology of our species. In repeated experiments, starting in the 1910s, chimpanzees raised in close contact with humans have universally failed to speak, or even to try to speak, despite their rapid progress in many other intellectual and motor domains. Each normal human is born with a capacity to rapidly and unerringly acquire their mother tongue, with little explicit teaching or coaching. In contrast, no nonhuman primate has spontaneously produced even a word of the local language.

Definition
Human communication can be defined as any Shared Symbolic Interaction.
 Shared, because each communication process also requires a system of signification (the Code) as its necessary condition, and if the encoding is not known to all those who are involved in the communication process, there is no understanding and therefore fails the same notification. 
 Symbolic, because there is need of a signifier or sign, which allows the transmission of the message.
 Interaction, since it involves two or more people, resulting in a further increase of knowledge on the part of all those who interact.

Types
Human communication can be subdivided into a variety of types:
 Intrapersonal communication (communication with oneself): This very basic form of information, is the standard and foundation, of all things communication. This communication with ourselves, showcases the process in which we think on our previous and ongoing actions, as well as what we choose to understand from other types of communications and events. Our intrapersonal communication, may be shown and expressed to others by our reactions to certain outcomes, through simple acts of gestures and expressions.
 Interpersonal communication (communication between two or more people) - Communication relies heavily on understanding the processes and situations that you are in, in order to communicate affectively. It is more than simple behaviors and strategies, on how and what it means to communicate with another person. Interpersonal communication, reflects the personality and characteristics, of a person, seen through the type of dialect, form, and content, a person chooses to communicate with. As simple as this is, interpersonal communication can only be correctly done if both persons involved in the communication, understand what it is to be human beings, and share similar qualities of what it means to be humans. It involves acts of trust and openness, as well as a sense of respect and care towards what the other person is talking about.
 Nonverbal communication: The messages we send to each other, in ways that cover the act of word-by-mouth. These actions may be done through the use of our facial features and expressions, arms and hands, the tone of our voice, or even our very appearance can display a certain type of message.
 Speech: Allowing words to make for an understanding as to what people are feeling and expressing. It allows a person to get a direct thought out to another by using their voice to create words that then turn into a sentence, which in turn then turns into a conversation to get a message across. "What is spoken or expressed, as in conversation; uttered or written words: seditious speech. A talk or public address, or a written copy of this: The senator gave a speech. The language or dialect of a nation or region: American speech. One's manner or style of speaking: the mayor's mumbling speech. The study of oral communication, speech sounds, and vocal physiology".
 Conversation: Allows however many people to say words back and forth to each other that will equal into meaningful rhythm called conversation. It defines ideas between people, or teams, or groups. To have a conversation requires at least two people, making it possible to share values and interests of each person. Conversation makes it possible to getting messages across to other people, whether that be an important message or just a simple message. "Strong conversation skills will virtually guarantee that you will be better understood by most people" 
 Visual communication: The type of communication where it involves using your eyes that allow you to read signs, charts, graphs and pictures that have words or phrases and or pictures showing and describing what needs to be portrayed to get information across. Using visual communication allows for people to live daily lives without constantly using your mouth to say things. A simple example is driving in the car and seeing a red sign that says stop on it, as a driver you are using visual communication to read the sign understand what is being said and stopping your car to not get into an accident. "If carried out properly, visual communication has various benefits. In the information era and fast-paced society in which time is limited, visual communication help to communicate ideas faster and better. Generally speaking, it offers these benefits: instant conveyance, ease of understanding, cross-cultural communication and generation of enjoyment".
 Writing: What I am forming together right now is called writing where it revolves putting words together to create a sentence that flows into a sentence of meaning. Words are letters that are put together to transform a word that allows the person to understand and follow along with what is being portrayed. Writing requires us to use hands and paper to form the words and letters to create the flow of a message or conversation. Writing can also be done in the form of typing which is what you are seeing here, forming words together on a computer. ""Writing" is the process of using symbols (letters of the alphabet, punctuation and spaces) to communicate thoughts and ideas in a readable form".
 Mail: This is in the form of postage which is in letter or package. When someone uses the post office service requiring them to send a letter that they wrote with pencil and paper or they are using the postage service to send an object to someone out of state. Makes for an easier process to send a loved one messages or objects that do not live next to you or within a 20 min drive distance. "Material (such as letters and packages) sent or carried in a postal system". For an example a loved one is in the military and is out of state, to let them know what is going on in your life and to also ask how they are doing you send them a letter via the postal service to get that message to them at their location. Workers at the postal service get the letters and packages across states and countries.
 Mass media: "The means of communication reaching a large number of people such as the population of a nation through certain channels like film, radio, books, music, or television in that the consumer participation stays passive with comparison to interactive network platforms". The television allows for getting messages to a lot of people in different locations in a matter of minutes making it for the fastest communication skill.
 Telecommunication: A style of communication that allows humans to understand conversation, speech and or visual communication through technology. Whether you are listening through a radio, or using your eyes to watch on a television, or reading words on an email that is Telecommunication. This type of communication allows for faster and more efficient process for a message to get across to another one from anywhere you are. Location is not a problem for this type of communication. "The transmission media in telecommunication have evolved through numerous stages of technology, from beacons and other visual signals (such as smoke signals, semaphore telegraphs, signal flags, and optical heliographs), to electrical cable and electromagnetic radiation, including light. Such transmission paths are often divided into communication channels, which afford the advantages of multiplexing multiple concurrent communication sessions. Telecommunication is often used in its plural form".
 Organizational communication (communication within organizations): Defined by structure and planning, making words, phrases, images flow into direction and meaning. "The construct of organizational communication structure is defined by its 5 main dimensions: relationships, entities, contexts, configuration, and temporal stability". Making it easier to work into groups of different culture and thoughts.
 Mass communication: This type of communication involves the process of communicating with known and unknown audiences, through the use of technology or other mediums. There is hardly ever an opportunity for the audience to respond directly to those who sent the message, there is a divide/separation between the sender and receiver. There are typically four players in the process of mass communication, these players are: those who send the message, the message itself, the medium in which the message is sent, and those who receive the message. These four components come together to be the communication we see and are a part of the most, as the media helps in distributing these messages to the world every day.
 Group dynamics (communication within groups): Allows ideas to be created within a group of people, allowing many minds to think together to form and create meaning. "The interactions that influence the attitudes and behavior of people when they are grouped with others through either choice or accidental circumstances".
 Cross-cultural communication (communication across cultures): This allows different people from different locations, gender, and culture, in a group to feed off of each others ideas to form something much bigger and better. "Culture is a way of thinking and living whereby one picks up a set of attitudes, values, norms and beliefs that are taught and reinforced by other members in the group".

Important figures

See also
 Communication basic topics
 General semantics
 History of communication
 Language
 Mass communication
 Mass media
 Outline of communication
 Pragmatics
 Semiotics
Intercultural communication
Cross-cultural communication
Proactive communications

References

Further reading 
 Richard Budd & Brent Ruben, Human Communication Handbook.
 Budd & Ruben, Approaches to Human Communication.
 How Human Communication Fails (Tampere University of Technology)